Date and time notation in Italy records the date using the day–month–year format ( or ). The time is written using the 24-hour clock; in spoken language and informal contexts the 12-hour clock is more commonly adopted, but without using "a.m." or "p.m." suffixes.

Date
In Italy, the all-numeric form for dates is in the day–month–year format, using a stroke as the separator; sometimes a dot or a hyphen is used instead of the stroke. Years can be written with two or four digits; day and month are traditionally written without zero padding (1/9/1985) although forms and computing made it common (01/09/1980). Long dates are expressed optionally with the day of the week. Months and weekdays are written with a lowercase letter since they are not considered proper nouns.

  or 
 2/6/1992 or 2/6/92 – 02/06/1992

In written and spoken language, a date or year is preceded by the definite article (with or without the preposition "in"):

  or 
  or 
  o ;  o 

The other days of the month always follow the cardinal form. Two-digit years may be used in the expanded form, elided with an apostrophe: "", although this notation is considered informal and less preferable. More rarely, three-digit years may also be found: "".

In letter writing, the date is preceded with the place in which the letter has been written, usually with the definite article:

 
 

The archaic plural article li (a variant of the current plural articles i or gli) still endures in bureaucratic correspondence but should be avoided. The article originally referred to "days", which became commonly implied in use. It is also not uncommon to read lì ("there") in official documents, an incorrect form originated by the erroneous interpretation of the article as an adverb of place.

An unfamiliar format is year–month–day, explicitly used in computing contexts to avoid ambiguity from DMY format (1992-12-31). The first day of the week in Italy is Monday, but for the Church the first day is Sunday.

Time
Official time is always given in 24-hour format. The 24-hour notation is used in writing with a dot or a colon as a separator. It is also common to use the comma as a separator, even if this is generally considered incorrect. The minutes are written with two digits; the hour numbers can be written with or without zero padding (02:05 or 2:05).

In oral communication 12-hours are prominently used since 24-hours are considered very formal. In 12-hours, hour figures are always preceded by the definite article and a.m. or p.m. are never used.  is 1 p.m. (1 in the afternoon),  is 2 p.m.,  is 3 p.m. etc. Midnight is simply . Whether one is referring to a.m. or p.m. is generally implicit in the context of the conversation; otherwise, more information must be provided to avoid confusion:  (3:18 p.m.).

Furthermore, in Tuscany, until recent times, l'una was virtually unknown: Tuscans used to say il tocco ("the toll", referring to the church bell) instead for both 1 p.m. or 13:00 and 1 a.m. or 01:00.

References

See also

Italy